Partington is a civil parish in the Metropolitan Borough of Trafford, Greater Manchester, England.  The parish contains three listed buildings that are recorded in the National Heritage List for England.  All the listed buildings are designated at Grade II, the lowest of the three grades, which is applied to "buildings of national importance and special interest".  The parish contains the town of Partington, and the listed buildings consist of a farmhouse, a set of stocks, and a church.


Buildings

References

Citations

Sources

Lists of listed buildings in Greater Manchester